Alexios Angelos may refer to:
 Alexios III Angelos (1153–1211), Byzantine emperor from 1195 to 1203
 Alexios IV Angelos (1182–1204), Byzantine emperor from August 1203 to January 1204
 Alexios Angelos Philanthropenos, ruler of Thessaly c. 1373 to his death c. 1390